Smeringurus mesaensis, the dune scorpion or giant sand scorpion, is a species of scorpion in the family Vaejovidae. It is a common species found in the deserts of the south-western United States. The dune scorpion is approximately 72 mm in length and 2.0 g in mass. They are fossorial and solitary, though young will aggregate shortly after dispersing from their mother. Females of this species are typically larger than males, with males traveling to find females during mating season. Smeringurus mesaensis are nocturnal creatures: they have been studied to remain active during the hours of 9 p.m. and 3 a.m., and this accounts for its lack of visibility during the daytime.

References

Vaejovidae
Animals described in 1957